The Pousette-Dart Band [poo-sette] (also known as PDB) was an American soft rock group active in the 1970s and early 1980s. Conceived in 1973 as a string band from Cambridge, Massachusetts, PDB comprised Jon Pousette-Dart, John Troy and John Curtis. With a shift to a more commercially oriented sound and a steady succession of additional personnel, the group went on to record a series of four albums for their label Capitol Records, two of which (Amnesia and Pousette-Dart Band 3) made the Billboard album chart. Their single "For Love" reached #83 on the Billboard singles chart.

Although the band formally broke up in 1981, members reunited in 1991 for a series of concerts, and a "Best Of" album was released in 1994. Since then, collaborations among various former personnel have continued, with original members Pousette-Dart and Troy also launching solo careers.

The song "Fall on Me" from the band's second album Amnesia was featured in the 11th episode of the second season of Lost.

Pousette-Dart is the son of Abstract Expressionist artist Richard Pousette-Dart.

Discography
Albums
1976 - Pousette Dart Band
1977 - Amnesia, US Billboard # 143
1978 - Pousette-Dart Band 3, US Billboard # 161
1979 - Never Enough, US Billboard # 203
1993 - Best of Pousette Dart Band

Singles
1976 - What Can I Say
1977 - Fall on Me
1977 - Amnesia
1978 - Stand by Me, US Cash Box # 103
1979 - For Love, US Billboard # 83
1979 - Hallelujah I'm a Bum

References

External links
Jon Pousette-Dart official site
John Troy official site

American soft rock music groups
American country rock groups
Rock music groups from Massachusetts
Musical groups from Cambridge, Massachusetts
Musical groups established in 1973
Musical groups disestablished in 1981
Musical groups reestablished in 1991
Musical groups disestablished in 1991
American musical trios
Capitol Records artists